Spirity Cove was a small town located at the mouth of Ingornachoix Bay on the west coast of Newfoundland and Labrador. The primary industry was fishing  in the summer and logging in Hawkes Bay in the winter. The population of Spirity Cove and Kings Cove combined peaked at 96 in 1935. The community was resettled in 1966 but was still inhabited by two families until 1968. The area is still used for fishing and seasonal cabins.

See also
List of communities in Newfoundland and Labrador
List of ghost towns in Newfoundland and Labrador

References 
 Smallwood, Joseph R. Encyclopedia of Newfoundland and Labrador, Newfoundland Book Publishers Ltd., 1967, p. 262
 

Ghost towns in Newfoundland and Labrador